"All Over Me" is a song written by Earl Thomas Conley, Michael Pyle, and Blake Shelton. It was released in October 2001 as the second single from Shelton's debut album, Blake Shelton.

Shelton was introduced to Conley by good friend Pyle, who was playing in Conley's band at the time. Shelton has long considered Earl Thomas Conley his all time musical hero. The three wrote the song at Conley's house in 1999.

Shelton sings in a falsetto on the chorus.

Chart positions
"All Over Me" debuted at number 54 on the U.S. Billboard Hot Country Singles & Tracks for the week of October 20, 2001.

References

2001 singles
Blake Shelton songs
Songs written by Earl Thomas Conley
Songs written by Blake Shelton
Warner Records Nashville singles
2001 songs